CX CMa (CX Canis Majoris) is a blue variable star in the Canis Major constellation. Discovery of this variable is usually credited to German Astronomer Cuno Hoffmeister in 1931, although this remains uncertain.

It is an eclipsing binary of Algol (detached) whose magnitude varies between 9.9 and 10.4 with a period of 0.95462500 day  (22.911000 hour). The variability was first discovered in 1931. Doubts arose because of scatter in the data and the small amplitude, but the discovery was confirmed by 1949. Its Algol-type light curve exhibits the O'Connell effect, meaning that there is a magnitude difference between subsequent maxima.

The spectral type of the secondary star is estimated to be in the B8 to A0 range.

References

B-type main-sequence stars
Canis Major
Beta Lyrae variables
Canis Majoris, CX
Durchmusterung objects